The Grand National Roadster Show (a.k.a.: GNRS, or sometimes referred to as Oakland Roadster Show but never officially called that), started in 1950, and is one of the oldest and longest continuously operating exhibitions of custom vehicles in the United States.

History 
In 1949, while Al Slonaker was preparing for his first automobile show at the Oakland Exposition, an Oakland, CA area hot rod club convinced him to exhibit ten of these cars at the show. The next year, Slonaker decided to focus on just the hot rods but concerned over possible bad press, it was instead called the "National Roadster Show." In 1962, the "Grand" was added to the event's name, making it the Grand National Roadster Show. 

In 1967, the show moved to the Oakland Coliseum From 1998 until 2003, it was held at a variety of other San Francisco Bay Area venues. Starting in 2004, it has operated in Pomona, California, at the Fairplex.

Award 

Starting in 1950, the grand prize at the show was the "Most Beautiful Roadster" award. It is a 9-foot "megatrophy" that engraved the winner's name on it. Though it's unclear what year it happened, the name of the trophy was lengthened to "America's Most Beautiful Roadster", which is how it reads today.

America's Best Competition Car Award 
From 1957 until 1971, there was a separate "America's Best Competition Car Award" given out at the show.

Further reading

References

External links 
 

1949 establishments in the United States
Auto shows in the United States
1949 establishments in California